Lepidoblepharis heyerorum is a species of gecko, a lizard in the family Sphaerodactylidae. The species is endemic to northeastern South America.

Etymology
The specific name, heyerorum (genitive, plural), is in honor of American herpetologist William Ronald "Ron" Heyer and his wife Miriam.

Geographic range
L. heyerorum is found in Brazil (Amapá, Amazonas, Pará) and in French Guiana.

Reproduction
L. heyerorum is oviparous.

References

Further reading
Vanzolini P (1978). "Lepidoblepharis in Amazonia". Papéis Avulsos de Zoologia, São Paulo 31 (13): 203–211. (Lepidoblepharis heyerorum, new species).

Lepidoblepharis
Reptiles of Brazil
Reptiles of French Guiana
Reptiles described in 1978